Brotherson is a surname. Notable people with the surname include:

 Laura M. Brotherson, American author
 Moetai Brotherson (born 1969), French politician

See also
 Brotherson Dock, Port Botany, Australia
 Brotherton (surname)

Surnames of German origin